Areej Mohyudin is a Pakistani television actress. She made her on-screen debut with Momina Duraid's Tajdee-e-Wafa in 2018 and later appeared in Jo Tu Chahey in same year. She then played the leading roles in Tum Se Kehna Tha (2020)  and Roag (2022).

Television

References 

Living people
Year of birth missing (living people)
Date of birth missing (living people)
21st-century Pakistani actresses